Syahrini is an Indonesian singer, songwriter, and actress. This is list awards received by Syahrini:

Ada-Ada Aja Awards
The Ada-Ada Aja Awards are an awards ceremony presented by Global TV and the program Ada-Ada Aja for celebrities who had to be guest stars in the Global TV' reality show. Syahrini has received one award.

!
|-
| 2016
| Syahrini
| Most Especial Artist
| 
| 
|-

Anugerah Musik Indonesia
The Anugerah Musik Indonesia (English translation: Indonesian Music Awards), is an annual Indonesian major music awards. They have been compared to the American Grammy Awards and British Brit Awards. The award was formalized in 1997 by ASIRI (Association of Indonesia Recording Industry), PAPPRI (Association of Indonesian Singers, Songwriters and Music Record Producers), and KCI (Copyright Office of Indonesia). It is the highest music awards given to outstanding artists in Indonesia.

!
|-
| 2012
| "Kau Yang Memilih Aku"
| rowspan= "2" | Best Pop Female Solo Artist
| 
|
|-
| 2014
| "Semua Karena Cinta"
| 
|
|-
| 2015
| "Cetarrrrr"
| rowspan= "2" | Best Dance/Electronic Production Work
| 
|
|-
| 2016
| "Dream Big" (feat. DJ Kevin Bun)
| 
|
|-

Bintang RPTI Awards

!
|-
| 2012
| Syahrini
| Celebrity Top Rating of the Year
| 
| 
|-

Bright Awards
The Bright Awards is a giving awards to creative people the world of advertising the country on television advertising are considered the most communicative. This awards show has teamed up with MNC Media and Unity of Indonesian Advertising Companies.

!
|-
| 2016
| Syahrini
| Favorite Female Star Advertisement
| 
|
|-

Dahsyatnya Awards
First established in 2009, the Dahsyatnya Awards are an awards ceremony were presented by the daily Indonesian TV show Dahsyat that airs on RCTI, to honour for artist who had more popular/outstanding (Indonesian: Terdahsyat) in music chart. Syahrini received three awards from 12 nominations.

!
|-
| rowspan= "2" | 2011
| "Jangan Memilih Aku" (feat. Anang Hermansyah)
| Outstanding Song
| 
| rowspan= "2" | 
|-
| Anang Hermansyah & Syahrini
| Outstanding Duo/Group Singer
| 
|-
| rowspan= "2" | 2012
| "Kau Yang Memilih Aku"
| Outstanding Song
| 
| rowspan= "2" |
|-
| rowspan= "5" | Syahrini
| rowspan= "2" | Outstanding Female Solo Singer
| 
|-
| rowspan= "2" | 2013
| 
| rowspan= "2" |
|-
| Outstanding Stage Act
| 
|-
| rowspan= "3" | 2014
| Outstanding Female Solo Singer
| 
| rowspan= "3" | 
|-
| Outstanding Stage Act
| 
|-
| Syahrini & Raffi Ahmad
| Outstanding Couple
| 
|-
| rowspan= "2" | 2015
| Syahrini & Maruli Tampubolon
| Outstanding Duet/Collaboration
| 
| rowspan= "2" |
|-
| rowspan= "2" | Syahrini
| rowspan= "2" | Outstanding Female Solo Singer
| 
|-
| 2016
| 
|
|-

Fokus Selebriti Awards
The Fokus Selebriti Awards are an awards ceremony, presented by infotainment Fokus Selebriti, awarding a celebrity who had to be phenomenal in life story and had the hottest news.

!
|-
| 2015
| Syahrini
| Favorite Exciting Celebrity
| 
|
|-

Global Seru Awards
The Global Seru Awards are awarded to celebrities who have caught the attention of the public through interesting or exciting accomplishments. Syahrini received one award from 2 nominations.

!
|-
| rowspan= "2" | 2015
| rowspan= "2" | Syahrini
| Most Exciting Hit
| 
| rowspan= "2" | 
|-
| Most Exciting Social Media Artist
| 
|-

Grazia Glitz & Glam Awards
The Grazia Glitz & Glam Awards are an off-air awards ceremony were presented by magazine Grazia Indonesia, to honour for celebrity in fashion and entertainment. Syahrini received one award.

!
|-
| 2013
| Syahrini
| Social Media Influencer
| 
| 
|-

Inbox Awards
Presented by Inbox and SCTV on 2008, the Inbox Awards are an annual awards had recognized to talent in music and entertainment. Syahrini received three awards from 12 nominations.

!
|-
| rowspan= "3" | 2011
| "Kau Yang Memilih Aku"
| Most Inbox Song
| 
| rowspan= "3" | 
|-
| rowspan= "9" | Syahrini
| Most Inbox Solo Singer
| 
|-
| Most Inbox Appearance
| 
|-
| rowspan= "2" | 2012
| Most Inbox Female Solo Singer
| 
| rowspan= "2" | 
|-
| Most Inbox Appearance
| 
|-
| rowspan= "2" | 2013
| Most Inbox Female Solo Singer
| 
| rowspan= "2" | 
|-
| Most Inbox Appearance
| 
|-
| 2014
| rowspan= "2" | Most Inbox Female Solo Singer
| 
|
|-
| rowspan= "3" | 2015
| 
| rowspan= "3" |
|-
| Most Inbox Darling Social Media Artist
| 
|-
| "Seperti Itu"
| Most Inbox Song
| 
|-
| 2016
| Syahrini
| Most Inbox Female Solo Singer
| 
|
|-

Indigo Digital Music Awards
The Indigo Digital Music Awards (formerly Indigo Awards), are an annual award were presented by PT. Telekomunikasi Indonesia (Telkom) in 2009, to honour for artist, who have their song used most as ringback tones in all categories of creative industries and provide benefits for society, the environment, and create new business opportunities.

!
|-
| rowspan= "2" | 2011
| rowspan= "2" | Syahrini
| Best Female Artist
| 
| rowspan= "2" | 
|-
| Best Pop Artist/Band
| 
|-

Indonesian Social Media Awards
First established in 2016 by SCTV, the Indonesian Social Media Awards are an annual awards were honour for celebrity and voted by fans in each social media, such as Facebook, Snapchat, Twitter and Instagram.

!
|-
| 2016
| Syahrini
| Female Celeb Instagram
| 
|
|-

Indonesian Television Awards
First established in 2016, the Indonesian Television Awards are an awards were to honour for talent in entertainment and program television for motivation to spawn creativity as well as innovation.

!
|-
| 2016
| Syahrini
| Most Popular Singer
| 
|
|-

Indosat Awards
The Indosat Awards are music awards presented by telecommunications provider Indosat, first presented in 2011. The awards are based on the popularity of a singer, as derived from sales, stage appearances, and radio chart positions.

!
|-
| rowspan= "2" | 2011
| Syahrini
| Best Female Artist
| 
| rowspan= "2" |
|-
| "Jangan Memilih Aku" (with Anang Hermansyah)
| Most Popular Collaboration
| 
|-

Infotainment Awards
The Infotainment Awards are an awards ceremony were presented by SCTV and began established since 2012, to awarded for celebrity in entertainment. Syahrini received seven awards from 12 nominations.

!
|-
| rowspan= "2" | 2012
| rowspan= "12" | Syahrini
| Most Infotainment Celebrity
| 
| rowspan= "2" | 
|-
| Most Infotainment Dressed Celebrity
| 
|-
| rowspan= "2" | 2013
| Most Lure Female Celebrity
| 
| rowspan= "2" | 
|-
| Most Awaited Celebrity Appearance
| 
|-
| rowspan= "2" | 2014
| Most Lure Female Celebrity
| 
| rowspan= "2" | 
|-
| Most Fashionable Female Celebrity
| 
|-
| rowspan= "4" | 2015
| Most Lure Female Celebrity
| 
| rowspan= "4" |
|-
| Most Awaited Celebrity Appearance
| 
|-
| Celebrity of the Year
| 
|-
| rowspan= "3" | Most Fashionable Female Celebrity
| 
|-
| 2016
| 
| 
|-
| 2017
| 
| 
|-

Insert

Insert Awards
The Insert Awards are an awards ceremony presented by program Insert, to awarded for celebrities in entertainment. Syahrini has received three awards from 8 nominations.

!
|-
| rowspan= "3" | 2011
| rowspan= "2" | Syahrini
| Sexiest Female
| 
| rowspan= "3" |
|-
| Celebrity of the Year
| 
|-
| Alhamdullilah Ya, Sesuatu Banget
| Most Popular Words
| 
|-
| rowspan= "2" | 2012
| rowspan= "2" | Syahrini
| Celebrity of the Year
| 
| rowspan= "2" |
|-
| The Richest and The Most Famous Celeb
| 
|-
| rowspan= "2" | 2014
| Syahrini's Jargon Sensation
| The Hottest Celebrity News
| 
| rowspan= "2" | 
|-
| rowspan= "2" | Syahrini
| The Iconic Celebrity
| 
|-
| 2016
| Celebrity of Social Media Award
| 
|
|-

Insert Fashion Awards

!
|-
| rowspan= "2" | 2015
| rowspan= "3" | Syahrini
| Most Fashionable Hair Do Celebrity
| 
| rowspan= "2" |
|-
| Most Fashionable Female Celebrity
| 
|-
| 2016
| Favorite Female Celebrity
| 
| 
|-

KLIK! Awards
The KLIK! Awards was an awards ceremony were established in 2011 and presented by program KLIK!, to honour for artist and clip makers in music.

!
|-
| 2011
| "Kau Yang Memilih Aku"
| Best Phenomenal Singer Artist
| 
|
|-

Nickelodeon Indonesia Kids' Choice Awards
The Nickelodeon Indonesia Kids' Choice Awards is Indonesian version of Nickelodeon Kids' Choice Awards, held since 2008 in Jakarta. Syahrini received two awards from 3 nominations.

!
|-
| rowspan= "3" | 2015
| rowspan= "3" | Syahrini
| Favorite Singer
| 
| rowspan= "3" | 
|-
| Icon of the Year
| 
|-
| Slime Star
| 
|-

Obsesi Awards

!
|-
| 2016
| Syahrini
| Most Excessive Celebrity
| 
| 
|-

Panasonic Gobel Awards
The Panasonic Gobel Awards is an award presented to television programs and individuals, based on poll results. The poll was originally conducted by the Indonesian tabloid Citra, but was taken over by Nielsen Media Research in 2004.

!
|-
| 2015
| Princess Syahrini
| Favorite Entertainment Talkshow Program
| 
|
|-

Pop Awards
The Pop Awards are an awards ceremony for celebrities which pervasive inspire the younger generation. The show was first held in 2016, which aired on RCTI.

!
|-
| 2016
| Syahrini
| Female Pop Awards
| 
|
|-

SCTV Awards
The SCTV Awards are an awards ceremony were presented by Indonesian TV station SCTV and began established in 2001, to honour talented artists who became popular (Indonesian: Ngetop) in entertainment, based on audience votes. Syahrini received five awards from 7 nominations.

!
|-
| 2011
| rowspan= "7" | Syahrini
| rowspan= "7" | Famous Singer
| 
| 
|-
| 2012
| 
| 
|-
| 2013
| 
| 
|-
| 2014
| 
| 
|-
| 2015
| 
| 
|-
| 2016
| 
| 
|-
| 2017
| 
|
|-

SCTV Music Awards
First established in 2002, the SCTV Music Awards are an annual award presented by SCTV, to honour talented artists who became popular (Indonesian: Ngetop) in music with the winner selected based on voting public through SMS. Syahrini received three awards from 6 nominations.

!
|-
| rowspan= "2" | 2012
| Sesuatu (single)
| Most Famous Female Solo Pop Album
| 
| rowspan= "2" | 
|-
| "Kau Yang Memilih Aku"
| Most Famous Song
| 
|-
| 2013
| rowspan= "4" | Syahrini
| rowspan= "4" | Most Famous Female Solo Singer
| 
|
|-
| 2014
| 
| 
|-
| 2015
| 
| 
|-
| 2016
| 
|
|-

Seleb On News Awards
The Seleb On News Awards are an annual awards were presented by infotainment Seleb On News to awarded for celebrities which to be part in entertainment.

!
|-
| rowspan= "3" | 2016
| rowspan= "4" | Syahrini
| Most Sexiest Celeb
| 
| rowspan= "3" |
|-
| Most Wanted Celeb
| 
|-
| rowspan= "2" | Most Social Media Celeb
| 
|-
| 2017
| 
|
|-

Selebrita Awards
The Selebrita Awards are an awards ceremony were presented by infotainment Selebrita, to awarded for celebrity in entertainment and based on voted by fans in website poll. Syahrini has received one award from three awards.

!
|-
| 2013
| rowspan= "4" | Syahrini
| Woman of the Year
| 
| 
|-
| 2015
| rowspan= "3" | Most Exist Celeb
| 
|
|-
| 2016
| 
|
|- 
| 2017
| 
|
|-

Silet Awards
The Silet Awards was an awards ceremony were presented by RCTI' infotainment Silet and established in 2014, to awarded for celebrity who had to be part in infotainment program. Syahrini received one award.

!
|-
| 2014
| Syahrini
| Razored Phenomenal Artist
| 
| 
|-

Social Media Awards
The Social Media Awards are presented to the businesses, brands, and people who are most widely discussed positively in social media. The recognizes those who successfully use social media to establish communications with consumer and fans. Syahrini received one award.

!
|-
| 2014
| Syahrini
| Best Singer in Social Media
| 
| 
|-

Socmed Awards
The Socmed Awards is an awards to celebrities and public figures who dominated the popularity of various social media platforms, such as Twitter, Instagram, Blogs, and YouTube.

!
|-
| 2016
| Syahrini
| Celeb Gram Female
| 
|
|-

Yahoo! OMG Awards
The Yahoo! OMG Awards are an online awards were honour to celebrity in entertainment, based on fans by visiting the website. Its first established in 2012. Syahrini received two awards.

!
|-
| 2012
| rowspan= "2" | Syahrini
| Most Exposed Celeb (Reader's Choice)
| 
| 
|-
| 2014
| Most Overexposed Celeb
| 
| 
|-

References

Syahrini